The Pegasus World Cup Turf Invitational is a Grade I American Thoroughbred horse race, by invitation for four-year-olds and older over a distance of one and one-eighth miles on the turf track, held annually in late January or early February at Gulfstream Park, Hallandale Beach, Florida. The event currently carries a purse of $1,000,000.

History 

The inaugural running of the event was on 2 March 1986, on the last day of a 71-day annual winter meeting as the Gulfstream Park Breeders Cup Handicap, the tenth race on the under-card of Florida Derby day. The event had additional sponsorship from the Breeders' Cup which gave the event immediate recognition and value. The event was won by Craig B. Singer's Irish-bred five-year-old Sondrio who started at odds of 7/1 and ran the  miles distance in 1:40.60 winning by  lengths. 

The following year the event was held on the dirt track due to the condition of the turf track. The event had additional sponsorship from Budweiser and this reflected in the name of the race. Budweiser sponsorship continued for nine years ceasing after the 1995 running of the event.

The event was upgraded in 1990 by the American Graded Stakes Committee to a Grade III race. In 1991 the distance of the event was lengthened considerably to  miles and the following year the event was upgraded to Grade II classification. In 1994 the event was transferred to the dirt track and held over a distance of  miles.

After the 2007 running of the event the Breeders' Cup ceased to sponsor the event and the event was known as the Gulfstream Park Turf Handicap. In 2009 the distance of the event was decreased by two furlongs to  miles.

In 2019 Gulfstream Park Administration created a racing series called the Pegasus World Cup and this event was rebranded as the Pegasus World Cup Turf Invitational.  In the first edition, each entrant's connections had to pay a $500,000 entry fee with the organizer adding an extra $1,000,000 for a total purse of $7,000,000. In the 2020 edition, the race adopted the Invitational format and entry fees were suppressed, so the purse was limited to the organizer contribution.

Records

Time record:  
 miles: 1:51.60 – Zulu Alpha (2020)
 miles: 1:39.60 – Youmadeyourpoint  (1990)
 miles: 1:45.63 – Almanaar (GB)  (2017)
 miles: 2:10.73 – Yagli (1999)

Margins:
 lengths – Man from Wicklow (2003)

Most wins:
 2 – Einstein (2006, 2008)
 2  – Colonel Liam (2021, 2022)

Most wins by an owner:
 2 – Allen E. Paulson (1998, 1999)
 2 – The Thoroughbred Corporation (2000, 2001)
 2 – Midnight Cry Stables (2006, 2008)
 2 – IEAH Stables (2009, 2010)
 2 – Robert E. & Lawana L. Low (2021, 2022)

Most wins by a jockey:
 7 – Jerry Bailey (1992, 1993, 1994, 1997, 1999, 2000, 2003)

Most wins by a trainer:
 5 – William I. Mott (1993, 1997, 1999, 2000, 2001)

Winners

Legend:

 
 

Notes:

§ Ran as an entry

† In the 2010 running of the event Take The Points was first past but was disqualified for interference in the straight and placed fifth and Court Vision was declared the winner.

See also 

 List of American and Canadian Graded races
 Gulfstream Park Turf Handicap top three finishers  
 Pegasus World Cup

References

Grade 1 turf stakes races in the United States
Grade 1 stakes races in the United States
Graded stakes races in the United States
Horse races in Florida
Open middle distance horse races
Gulfstream Park
Recurring sporting events established in 1986
1986 establishments in Florida